Eugenio Zampighi (1859–1944) was an Italian genre painter and photographer who mainly depicted joyous and idyllic images of Italian rural life, devoid of any hint of social criticism. Zampighi was influenced both by the style of Gaetano Chierici, and by the Florentine Macchiaioli School.

Paintings

External links

Sources
 
 

Works by Italian people
Zampighi
Lists of paintings